Craig Lauder Cameron (July 19, 1945 – April 20, 2012) was a Canadian ice hockey forward. He played 552 games in the National Hockey League between 1967 and 1976 with the Detroit Red Wings, St. Louis Blues, Minnesota North Stars, and New York Islanders.

Career statistics

Regular season and playoffs

External links 
 

1945 births
2012 deaths
Baltimore Clippers players
Canadian ice hockey forwards
Detroit Red Wings players
Edmonton Oil Kings (WCHL) players
Kansas City Blues players
Memphis Wings players
Minnesota North Stars players
New Haven Nighthawks players
New York Islanders players
St. Louis Blues players
Ice hockey people from Edmonton